The Allright (known in Germany as the Allreit and outside of Germany as the Vindec-Special) was a German automobile manufactured from 1908 to 1913 at the Cologne-Lindenthal factory that produced Allright, Tiger, Roland, and Vindec-Special bicycles and motorcycles. 

The first Allright-Mobil of 1908 was offered with an air-cooled  v-twin engine and four wire wheels.

From 1910 an improved model was offered, available as two-seater Runabout or delivery truck. Its 960cc v-twin engine delivered  at 1300 rpm. A rear-wheel-drive vehicle, its axle was driven via a conical leather clutch, a three-speed transmission, and chains. It was sold for 3,000 German gold marks.

Vindec-Special
In 1906 the Motor Cycling Club's gold medal was awarded to those who could complete the 391-mile journey from London to Edinburgh in under 24 hours. The fastest finisher was Tom Woodman (22h 38m) riding a 5-horsepower Vindec-Special motor-bicycle. W. H. 'Billy' Wells in second was also riding a Vindec-Special.

Vindec-Specials were also placed in the 1907 Isle of Man TT Twin Cylinder race, Billy Wells coming second and Arnold Dent fourth.

References

External links
www.coelner-zweiraeder.de

Brass Era vehicles
Defunct motor vehicle manufacturers of Germany